

Mount Montgomery State Reserve is a state reserve in the Dial Range of northwest Tasmania. It comprises  of land and is managed by the Tasmania Parks and Wildlife Service. It was established on 9 September 1970 and is described by the Parks and Wildlife Service as "scenic".

References

Further reading
Parks and Wildlife Service; Reserves under the Nature Conservation Act 2002; web publication; retrieved 8 April 2007.
Dial Range Recreation Management Plan; June 2000; Inspiring Place Consultants and Office of Sport and Recreation Tasmania.

State reserves of Tasmania